Christopher L. Andronicos (born December 1968 in Albuquerque, New Mexico, US) is  an American  geologist, associate professor of Geology at Purdue University.

Biography

He is the son of Domingo Montoya, former governor of Sandia Pueblo, and Maria Flying Horse, a Native American artist. He graduated from Del Norte High School in 1987 and the University of New Mexico where he majored in geology, graduating in 1995. He then attended Princeton University where he received a National Science Foundation Graduate Fellowship and Princeton's Dodson Fellowship, completing  his PhD in 1999.

He then took a position as an assistant professor at the University of Texas at El Paso. In 2005 he moved to a position at Cornell University where he was a member of the Institute for the Study of the Continents, and a member of the faculty in the Department of Earth and Atmospheric Sciences and the American Indian Program. In 2012, Andronicos accepted a position as an associate professor at Purdue University in the Department of Earth, Atmospheric, and Planetary Sciences.

His research is focused on understanding high temperature deformation in the deep crust and upper mantle. He has focused his work on continental orogenic belts in the southwestern United States, western Canada, and the Tibetan plateau. He has recently begun work on the Oman Ophiolite complex which provides access to rocks which once made up the Oceanic crust and upper mantle. He has published in journals including Nature, Tectonics, Terra Nova, and Earth and Planetary Science Letters and has received funding from the National Science Foundation for his research. His work in western Canada has been influential in both understanding magmatic arcs and the paleogeography of North America.

References

External links
 National Science Foundation Funded Batholiths Project web site.
 Cornell University Faculty Page
 Biography at ScienceCareers.org
 Department Web Page

1968 births
Pueblo people
Cornell University faculty
American geologists
Living people
Princeton University alumni
University of New Mexico alumni
University of Texas at El Paso faculty
People from Albuquerque, New Mexico